The Standard Portfolio Analysis of Risk, or SPAN, is a system for calculating margin requirements for futures and options on futures. It was developed by the Chicago Mercantile Exchange in 1988.

SPAN is a portfolio margining method that uses grid simulation. It calculates the likely loss in a set of derivative positions (also called a portfolio) and sets this value as the initial margin payable by the firm holding the portfolio. In this manner, SPAN provides for offsets between correlated positions and enhances margining efficiency.

External links
 http://www.cmegroup.com/confluence/display/pubspan/SPAN+Overview

Futures markets